is a retired Japanese hurdler who specialized in the 110 metres hurdles. He competed at the 2007 World Championships.

Personal bests

International competition

National titles
Japanese Championships
110 m hurdles: 2012

References

External links

Kenji Yahata at JAAF 
Kenji Yahata at Monteroza Co.,ltd. Athletics Club  (archived)

1980 births
Living people
Sportspeople from Ehime Prefecture
Japanese male hurdlers
World Athletics Championships athletes for Japan
Japan Championships in Athletics winners